Bank of Makati, (A Savings Bank) Inc. or BMI is a thrift bank established in 1956. It was founded as a rural bank prior to its approval by the Bangko Sentral ng Pilipinas to operate as a thrift bank on April 28, 2015; it officially became a savings bank.

History
The Bank of Makati was established on September 22, 1956, as the "Rural Bank of Makati, Inc." along J.P. Rizal in the then-town of Makati, Rizal. In October 2001, the banking company underwent a change in ownership as well as some reforms. In November 2005, the name of the company was officially changed to "Bank of Makati (A Rural Bank), Inc.".

In 2006, the banking company was included in the list of Top 1000 Corporations in the Philippines. According to the Business World Corporate Profile 2008, the Bank of Makati is the biggest rural bank in the country with total assets worth  and a net worth of more than  exceeding the worth of some savings banks.

The Bank of Company underwent a re-branding in 2009 and adopted a new logo and slogan. Bangko Sentral ng Pilipinas granted the Bank of Makati a Certificate of Authority to operate as a thrift bank on April 28, 2015. With the granting of the certificate, the banking company officially changed its name to "Bank of Makati (A Savings Bank), Inc.".

Services
Bank of Makati also provides motorcycle loans for customers of its sister company, Motortrade and its affiliate businesses, Motorjoy Depot Inc., Honda Prestige, and Motortrade Topline.

See also
BancNet
List of banks in the Philippines

References

Banks established in 1956
Banks of the Philippines
Companies based in Makati